= South Tyrol (disambiguation) =

South Tyrol is a political subdivision of Italy since 1926.

South Tyrol may also refer to:

- the part of the Austrian County of Tyrol south of the Alpine divide, corresponding to today's Italian region Trentino-Alto Adige/Südtirol;
- the widely Italian speaking part of the Austrian County of Tyrol, corresponding to today's Italian province Trentino (historically also called Welschtirol or Welschsüdtirol in order to stress its ethnicity);
